Pita Hydroelectric Power Station (PHPS) is a planned  hydroelectric power station, across the Fétoré River, a tributary of Kakrima River, in Guinea.

Location
The power station would be located near the town of Pita, in Pita Prefecture, in the Mamou Region, in south-central Guinea.

Overview
In September 2019, the French civil engineering and construction company Eiffage, presented the feasibility study for this power station to an audience in Conakry, Guinea's capital city. The Fétoré River, across which the dam will be built, is a seasonal river, which will support this power station for six months of the year, during the rainy season. It is now planned to build an associated solar power station to complement the seasonal hydroelectric dam.

Ownership
The Pita Hydroelectric Power Station, is under development and is owned by Eiffage, a French civil engineering and construction company.

Construction costs and timeline
The most recent available cost estimation for his renewable energy project is US$92.3 million. Construction will take approximately six years.

See also

List of power stations in Guinea

References

External links
  Country Profile: Guinea As of May 2016.

Hydroelectric power stations in Guinea
Proposed hydroelectric power stations
Mamou Region